The 1988 Munster Senior Hurling Championship Final was a hurling match played on Sunday 17 July 1988 at Gaelic Grounds, Limerick. It was contested by Cork and Tipperary. Tipperary captained by Pat O'Neill retained the title beating Cork on a scoreline of 2-19 to 1-13.

References

Munster
Munster Senior Hurling Championship Finals
Tipperary GAA matches
Cork county hurling team matches